Animals are multicellular eukaryotic organisms in the biological kingdom Animalia. With few exceptions, animals consume organic material, breathe oxygen, are able to move, reproduce sexually, and grow from a hollow sphere of cells, the blastula, during embryonic development. Over 1.5 million living animal species have been described—of which around 1 million are insects—but it has been estimated there are over 7 million in total. The study of animals is called zoology.

Animals may be listed or indexed by many criteria, including taxonomy, status as endangered species, their geographical location, and their portrayal and/or naming in human culture.

By common name 
 List of animal names (male, female, young, and group)

By aspect 
 List of common household pests
 List of animal sounds
 List of animals by number of neurons

By domestication 

List of domesticated animals

By eating behaviour 
List of herbivorous animals
List of omnivores
List of carnivores

By endangered status 

IUCN Red List endangered species (Animalia)
United States Fish and Wildlife Service list of endangered species

By extinction 
List of extinct animals
List of extinct birds
List of extinct mammals
List of extinct cetaceans
List of extinct butterflies

By region 
Lists of amphibians by region
Lists of birds by region
Lists of mammals by region
Lists of reptiles by region

By individual (real or fictional)

Real
List of individual cats
List of oldest cats
List of giant squids
List of individual elephants
List of historical horses
List of leading Thoroughbred racehorses
List of individual apes
List of individual bears
List of giant pandas
List of individual birds
List of individual bovines
List of individual cetaceans
List of individual dogs
List of oldest dogs
List of individual monkeys
List of individual pigs
List of wealthiest animals

Fictional
List of fictional bears
List of fictional birds
List of fictional cats
List of fictional pachyderms
List of fictional pigs

By taxonomical classification

Phyla

The animal Kingdom contains some 35 extant phyla.

Basal animals are delineated according to the following cladogram:

Animals: Porifera, Diploblasts

Diploblasts: Ctenophora, ParaHoxozoa

ParaHoxozoa: Placozoa, Cnidaria, Bilateria/Triploblast

Bilateria: Xenacoelomorpha, Nephrozoa

Nephrozoa: Protostomes, Deuterostomes

 Phylum Proarticulata † Disputed if this is in or out of Bilateria and Phylum Xenacoelomorpha is basal

Deuterostomia 
 Phylum Chordata
 Ambulacraria (unranked)
 Phylum Hemichordata
 Phylum Echinodermata
 Phylum Cambroernida †

Protostomia

Ecdysozoa 

 Phylum Saccorhytida? †
 Cycloneuralia (unranked)
 Scalidophora (unranked)
 Phylum Kinorhyncha
 Phylum Loricifera
 Phylum Priapulida
 Nematoida (unranked)
 Phylum Nematoda
 Phylum Nematomorpha
 Panarthropoda (unranked)
 Phylum Onychophora
 Tactopoda (unranked)
 Phylum Tardigrada
 Phylum Arthropoda

Spiralia 

 Gnathifera
 Phylum  Gnathostomulida
 Phylum  Rotifera
 Mesozoa
 Phylum Dicyemida
 Phylum Orthonectida
 Rouphozoa
 Phylum Gastrotricha
 Phylum Platyhelminthes
 Lophotrochozoa
 Phylum Hyolitha †
 Phylum Annelida
 Phylum Brachiopoda
 Phylum Bryozoa
 Phylum Cycliophora
 Phylum Entoprocta
 Phylum Mollusca
 Phylum Nemertea
 Phylum Phoronida

Chordata

 List of chordate orders

Fish

 List of fish families
 List of fish common names

Amphibians

 List of amphibians

Reptiles

 List of reptiles
 List of ichthyosaur genera
 List of pterosaur genera
 List of plesiosaur genera
List of dinosaur genera
 List of snakes
 List of snake genera
 List of boine species and subspecies
 List of erycine species and subspecies
 List of pythonid species and subspecies
 List of tropidophiid species and subspecies
 List of uropeltid species and subspecies
 List of crotaline species and subspecies
 List of viperine species and subspecies
 List of anomalepidid species and subspecies
 List of leptotyphlopid species and subspecies
 List of typhlopid species and subspecies
 List of Testudines families (tortoises, turtles and terrapins)

References